Persuasive Percussion Volume 4 is a studio album by Enoch Light and The Command All Stars. It was produced by Enoch Light and released in 1961 on Light's Command Records label (catalog no. RS 830-SD).

Persuasive Percussion Volume 4 debuted on the Billboard magazine pop album chart on March 3, 1962, peaked at the No. 34 spot, and remained on the chart for five weeks.

AllMusic gave the album a rating of four-and-a-half stars.

Track listing 
Side A
 "Oh Lady Be Good" [3:03]
 "I May Be Wrong" [2:27]
 "It's De Lovely" [2:13]
 "Hello Young Lovers" [4:13]
 "Am I Blue" [2:56]
 "Besame Mucho" [3:22]

Side B
 "Hold Me" [2:02]
 "You Brought A New Kind Of Love To Me" [3:35]
 "In The Mood" [2:27]
 "Got A Date With An Angel" [3:08]
 "Can't Get Enough For My Baby" [2:40]
 "My Blue Heaven" [2:50]

References

Enoch Light albums
1961 albums
Command Records albums